The Tinder Box (1999) is a crime novella by English writer Minette Walters. First published in Dutch as part of their annual "BookWeek" scheme, the story wasn't available in English until 2004.

Synopsis
Following the savage murders of Lavinia Fanshaw and her personal nurse, Dorothy Jenkins, in the small Hampshire village of Sowerbridge, Irish labourer Patrick O'Riordian is arrested for the crime, stirring up violent racial hatred from the other residents against his family. Friend and neighbour Siobhan Lavenham suspects that Patrick was the victim of an already prejudiced investigation, and defies her community so she can prove him innocent. However, after learning of some terrible secret's from the O'Riordian's past, she begins to question her loyalties.

External links 
More about The Tinder Box on Walters' website
Agent's dedicated page

1999 British novels
Novels by Minette Walters
British novellas
Novels set in Hampshire
Dutch-language novels